Three Mile Bay Historic District is a national historic district located at Lyme near Chaumont in Jefferson County, New York.  The district includes six contributing buildings.  The four principal buildings are a church, its associated parsonage, a grange hall, and a four-room schoolhouse.

It was listed on the National Register of Historic Places in 1990.

References

Historic districts on the National Register of Historic Places in New York (state)
Historic districts in Jefferson County, New York
National Register of Historic Places in Jefferson County, New York